Jens Volkmann (born 31 May 1967) is a German middle-distance runner. He competed in the men's 3000 metres steeplechase at the 1988 Summer Olympics.

References

1967 births
Living people
Athletes (track and field) at the 1988 Summer Olympics
German male middle-distance runners
German male steeplechase runners
Olympic athletes of West Germany
Athletes from Berlin
21st-century German people
20th-century German people